Gary Biggs (born 1977) is a former hurler from Northern Ireland, who played as a left-wing forward at senior level for the Derry county team.

Biggs joined the panel during the 1997 championship and immediately became a regular member of the starting fifteen until his retirement after the 2006 Nicky Rackard Cup. During that time he won one Nicky Rackard Cup medal and two Ulster medals.

At club level Biggs is a one-time county club championship medalist with Banagher.

References

1977 births
Living people
Banagher hurlers
Derry inter-county hurlers